The Nigerian National Sports Festival is a biennial multi-sport event organized by the Federal Government of Nigeria through the National Sports Commission for athletes from the 36 States of Nigeria.

Started and staged in 1973 at the National Stadium, Surulere in Lagos, the game was originally conceived as a "unifying tool" with the main purpose of promoting peace and cross-cultural affiliation in Nigeria after the Nigerian Civil War in 1970. The game also serves as a development and training event to aid athletes prepare for continental and international meets. The objectives of the National Sports Festival is:

 To build a robust talent pool of athletes
 To enhance and elevate sports at grassroots level
 To establish a standard programme for athletes’ succession
 To enhance and elevate sports at grassroots level
 To curb age cheating in Sports
 To encourage early participation in Sports
 To engage young athletes in the Olympic Movement, skill development and social responsibility
 To enhance cultural and educational development
 To promote National unity

COVID-19 and Nigerian National Sport Festival 

The 2020 edition of the biennial sporting event was set to take place in March 2020 at the Samuel Ogbemudia Stadium in Benin City, Edo State. However, due to the global health crisis occasioned by the COVID-19 pandemic, the event was postponed to December 2020. The sporting event further suffered another set back as a result of the second wave of the spread of the virus and the event was postponed to 2021.

References

External links
 Official website

1973 establishments in Nigeria
Multi-sport events in Nigeria
National multi-sport events
Recurring sporting events established in 1973
Sports festivals in Nigeria